Covington High School is a public high school in Covington, Ohio. It is the only high school in the Covington Exempted Village School District. Their teams are nicknamed the Buccaneers, or Buccs, while their basketball mascot is Buccy the Buccaneer.

Extramural events
Sports at the school include football, basketball, volleyball, cheer, cross country, track and field, swimming, baseball, softball, golf, and wrestling. As of 2021, the school belongs to the Three Rivers Conference.  Students may also participate in marching band.

References

External links
 Covington High School official website

High schools in Miami County, Ohio
Public high schools in Ohio